Kutak Rural District is a rural district (dehestan) in the Central District of Kahnuj County, Kerman Province, Iran. According to the 2011 census, its population was 8,768, in 2,104 families. The rural district has 25 villages. It was founded in 2011. Its capital is Kutak-e Vasat.

References 

Rural Districts of Kerman Province